The 2012–13 Montana Grizzlies basketball team represented the University of Montana during the 2012–13 NCAA Division I men's basketball season. The Grizzlies, led by seventh year head coach Wayne Tinkle, played their home games at Dahlberg Arena and were members of the Big Sky Conference. They finished the season 25–7, 19–1 in Big Sky play to win the Big Sky regular season championship. They were also champions of the Big Sky tournament, winning the championship game over Weber State, to earn the conference's automatic bid to the 2013 NCAA tournament where they lost in the second round to Syracuse 34–81. The 47 win by Syracuse is the most lopsided win by a team seeded 3 or lower in the history of the tournament, breaking a record set only one hour prior when 5 seed VCU defeated 13 seed Akron by 46.

Roster

Schedule

|-
!colspan=9| Exhibition

|-
!colspan=9| Regular season

|-
!colspan=9| Big Sky tournament

|-
!colspan=9|NCAA tournament

References

Montana Grizzlies basketball seasons
Montana
Montana
Montana Grizzlies basketball
Montana Grizzlies basketball